Bni Marghnine (Tarifit: Bni Marɣnin, ⴱⵏⵉ ⵎⴰⵔⵖⵏⵉⵏ; Arabic:  بني مرغنين) is a commune in Driouch Province of the Oriental administrative region of Morocco. At the time of the 2004 census, the commune had a total population of 7158 people living in 1416 households.

References

Populated places in Driouch Province
Rural communes of Oriental (Morocco)